Today is a studio album released in 1988 by the American R&B group Today. The album was the group's debut album, and included the charting singles "Girl I Got My Eyes On You", "Take It Off" and "Him or Me".

Track listing

Personnel
Frederick Lee "Bubba" Drakeford – vocals
Larry "Chief" Singeltary – vocals
Larry "Love" McCain – vocals
Wesley "Wes" Adams - vocals
Bernard Belle – arranger, producer
Teddy Riley – arranger, mixing, producer
Gene Griffin – producer
Dae Bennett – engineer
Alan Gregorie – mixing, remixing
Timmy Regisford – mixing, remixing
Dennis Mitchell – engineer, mixing

Charts

Weekly charts

Year-end charts

References

1988 debut albums
Today (group) albums
Motown albums
MCA Records albums